Barney is a surname. Notable people with the surname include:

 Albert B. Barney (1835-1910), American politician
 Albert W. Barney Jr. (1920–2010), American lawyer and Chief Justice of the Vermont Supreme Court
 Alice Pike Barney (1857–1931), American painter
 Charles D. Barney (1844–1945), American stockbroker, founder of Charles D. Barney & Co
 Darwin Barney (born 1985), American baseball player
 George Barney (1792–1862), Royal Engineers officer and Lieutenant Governor of the Colony of North Australia
 Gerald O. Barney (born 1937), American physicist
 Gerry Barney (born 1939), British designer
 John Barney (1785–1857), U.S. Congressman from Maryland
 Joseph Barney (1753–1832), English painter
 Joseph Nicholson Barney (1818–1899), Confederate Navy officer during the American Civil War, grandson of Joshua
 Joshua Barney (1759–1818), US Navy commodore during the Revolutionary War
 Keith Barney (born 1979), American guitarist, Eighteen Visions
 Lem Barney (born 1945), American football player
 Maginel Wright Enright Barney (1881–1966), American children's book illustrator
 Matthew Barney (born 1967), American sculptor and film artist
 Matthew Barney (boxer) (born 1974), British boxer
 Natalie Clifford Barney (1876–1972), American playwright, poet and novelist
 Rex Barney (1924–1997), American baseball player
 Scott Barney (born 1979), Canadian ice hockey player
 Susan Hammond Barney (1834–1922), American evangelist, writer
 Tina Barney (born 1945), American photographer